Lucius Cornelius Scipio (born c. 300 BC), consul in 259 BC during the First Punic War was a consul and censor of ancient Rome. He was the son of Lucius Cornelius Scipio Barbatus, himself consul and censor, and brother to Gnaeus Cornelius Scipio Asina, himself twice consul. Two of his sons (Publius Cornelius Scipio and Gnaeus Cornelius Scipio Calvus) and three of his grandsons (Scipio Africanus, Scipio Asiaticus and Scipio Nasica) also became consuls and were all famous generals. Among these five men, the most famous was Scipio Africanus.

As consul in 259 BC, he led the Roman fleet in the capture of Aleria and then Corsica, but failed against Olbia in Sardinia. The Fasti Triumphales record that he was awarded a triumph, but two other inscriptions on his career do not mention it. The following year he was elected censor with Gaius Duilius. He was succeeded by Gaius Sulpicius Paterculus as second consul.

He later dedicated a temple to the Tempestates, locating it near the Porta Capena.

Epitaph

Fragments of his sarcophagus were discovered in the Tomb of the Scipios and are now in the Vatican Museums. They preserve his epitaph, written in Old Latin:

L·CORNELIO·L·F·SCIPIO
AIDILES·COSOL·CESOR

HONC OINO·PLOIRVME·COSENTIONT R
DVONORO·OPTVMO·FVISE·VIRO
LVCIOM·SCIPIONE·FILIOS·BARBATI
CONSOL·CENSOR·AIDILIS·HIC·FVET·A
НЕС·CE PIT·CORSICA·ALERIAQVE·VRBE
DEDET·TEMPESTATEBVS·AIDE·MERETO

which has been transcribed and restored in modern upper- and lower-case script as:

and also transcribed in classical Latin as:

A translation is:

Romans for the most part agree,
that this one man, Lucius Scipio, was the best of good men.
He was the son of Barbatus,
Consul, Censor, Aedile.
He took Corsica and the city of Aleria.
He dedicated a temple to the Storms as a just return.

This inscription is number two of the elogia Scipionum, the several epitaphs surviving from the tomb.

References

3rd-century BC Roman consuls
Roman censors
Senators of the Roman Republic
Lucius
Roman patricians
300s BC births
Year of birth uncertain
Year of death unknown